MV Plassy, or Plassey, was a cargo ship in the Irish Merchant Service, operating during the 1950s. It was built as HMS Juliet, a  naval trawler of the Royal Navy at the start of the Second World War, and sold into merchant service at the end of the conflict. As Plassy it was wrecked in a storm off Inisheer, and is best known as the wreck seen on the foreshore of 'Craggy Island' in the TV comedy, Father Ted.

As Juliet
Juliet was built by Cook, Welton & Gemmell at Beverley, Yorkshire, at the beginning of World War II. It was ordered on 12 December 1939 and laid down the following May. It was launched on 2 October 1940 and entered service with the Royal Navy on 20 March 1941 as a minesweeper. Juliet served in home waters until November 1942 when it took part in Operation Torch, the Allied landings in French North Africa. Thereafter it worked in the Mediterranean. At the end of the conflict Juliet was no longer required by the Royal Navy and in 1947 it was converted into a cargo vessel and sold into the British Merchant service as Peterjon.

As Plassy
In 1951 it was acquired by the Limerick Steamship Company and renamed Plassy after the Plassey area near Limerick, which was in turn named after Robert Clive (Baron Plassey), who took his title from the 1757 Battle of Plassey, in India. As Plassy (sometimes spelled Plassey) it operated around the coast of Ireland carrying general cargo until her loss in 1960.

Fate
On 8 March 1960, while sailing through Galway Bay carrying a cargo of whiskey, stained glass and yarn, it was caught in a severe storm and ran onto Finnis Rock, Inisheer, Aran Islands.

A group of local Islanders, the Inisheer Rocket Crew, rescued the entire crew from the stricken vessel using a breeches buoy; an event captured in a pictorial display at the National Maritime Museum in Dún Laoghaire.

Several weeks later, a second storm washed the ship off the rock and drove it ashore on the island.

The wreck today
The wreck still lies on the shoreline and is a tourist attraction. It is visible in the opening credits of the television series Father Ted. In early January 2014, Storm Christine shifted the wreck's position on the coast for the first time since 1991.

References

External links

HMS Juliet (T136) at uboat.net

 Michael Kirwan (winter 2010) "The Last Voyage of the M.V. Plassy"
Robert Straughton (12 April 2016) "The Plassey Story"  

1940 ships
Aran Islands
Maritime incidents in 1960
Merchant ships of the United Kingdom
Juliet
Ships built in England
Ships sunk with no fatalities
Shipwrecks in the Atlantic Ocean
Shipwrecks of Ireland